Xanthomicrogaster is a genus of braconid wasps in the family Braconidae. There are about six described species in Xanthomicrogaster, found in the Neotropics.

Species
These six species belong to the genus Xanthomicrogaster:
 Xanthomicrogaster fortipes Cameron, 1911
 Xanthomicrogaster maculata Penteado-Dias, Shimabukuro & van Achterberg, 2002
 Xanthomicrogaster otamendi Martínez, 2018
 Xanthomicrogaster pelides Nixon, 1965
 Xanthomicrogaster sayjuhu Martínez, 2018
 Xanthomicrogaster seres Nixon, 1965

References

Further reading

 
 
 

Microgastrinae